South Shulin is a station on the Taiwan Railways Administration West Coast line located in Shulin District, New Taipei, Taiwan. South Shulin Station is located at the intersection of Zhongshan Road and Dongxing Street.

Name
Representatives of the Shulin District office surveyed 1078 citizens to gather public opinion on a favorable station name. Results of the survey are as follows: South Shulin (42.5%), Dongxing (30.5%). The remaining names include: Shijin Shouji (0.4%), Dongshan (0.3%), Xia Shanjia (0.2%), Shulin Dispatch Station (0.1%), Shujia (0.1%), Xinxing (0.1%), Shuxing (0.1%), New Shulin (0.1%).

Before the opening of the station, the area in which the station is currently located was called "Shulin Train Yard and Simple Train Stop." On 3/25/2015, the Shulin District Office held a naming meeting to determine the name of the future train station. Station names such as Shushan, Shudiao, and South Shulin were considered before deciding on the name South Shulin Station.

History
Shulin Station was built as a commuter station and is the third station in New Taipei City's Shulin District after Shulin Station and Shanjia Station.

 12/4/2007: Groundbreaking ceremony
 2/2009: Construction began, budget NTD 125 million
 8/2015: Construction completed
 12/23/2015: Station opened

Station structure 
 one island platform

Platform A: Taiwan Railway main line toward Taoyuan, Hsinchu (Shanjia Station)

Platform B: Taiwan Railway main line toward Taipei, Keelung/Su'ao (Shulin Station)

Service 
 Service only to local trains
 Trains longer than eight cars are not permitted to stop at this station or similar commuter stations including Sankeng, Fuzhou, Fugang, North Hsinchu.
 Management of this station falls under the supervision of Shulin Station.
 This station accepts EasyCard, iPASS, and other similar contactless smartcards as payments.

Around the station
 Sijihong Community
 Shulin Marshalling Yard
 YouBike Station
 South Shulin Station
Lujiao Creek Wetlands (1.8km to the southeast)
Dongsheng Park (900m to the northeast)

References 

2015 establishments in Taiwan
Railway stations in New Taipei
Railway stations opened in 2015
Railway stations served by Taiwan Railways Administration